Huochangping is a town in Shaodong, Hunan, China.
The town is bordered to the north by the towns of Shashi and Liuguangling, to the east by the towns of Yangqiao and Shetianqiao, to the south by the towns of Yejiping and Jianjialong, and to the west by Xiancha Town and Zhouguanqiao Township.

History
After the establishment of the Communist Sate in 1949, it belonged to the 12th District of Shaoyang County. It came under the jurisdiction of Shaodong County in February 1952. In 1955 it was known as "Huochangping District". In 1958 it was renamed "Huochangping People's Commune".  It was restored as a township in 1984. In 1995 Longgongqiao Township was merged into the town.

Administrative division
As of 2017, the town is divided into 50 villages and one community.

Geography
Tongjiang River flows through the town east to west.

The town enjoys a subtropical humid monsoon climate, enjoying four distinct seasons and abundant precipitation.

Economy
The town's main industries are agriculture, mining and shoe-making industry.

Notable people
Zhao Xuegui, revolutionist.
Zhao Qinfang, revolutionist.
Zhao Xucheng, revolutionist.
Long Chuan, revolutionist.
He Yiqun, revolutionist.
Wang Xianzhang, revolutionist.
Zhao Dongchu, professor.
Zhao Huaping, professor.
Zhao Chunwu, professor.

References

Divisions of Shaodong